"Only for Love" is the debut single by former Kajagoogoo singer Limahl, following being fired from the group by his bandmates in 1983. The song was included on Limahl's 1984 debut solo album, Don't Suppose. The song became his first UK Top 20 hit, peaking at No. 16 on the UK Singles Chart. It remains his second most popular single in the UK as a solo act (the first being "The Neverending Story").

Limahl performed the song with Beth Anderson on the TV show American Bandstand on March 9, 1985.

The song also played a part in the singer meeting producer Giorgio Moroder, while he was performing the song at a rock festival in Tokyo the following year. Moroder would help Limahl reach greater international success later in his career.

Personnel
Limahl - vocals, keyboards

Charts

Weekly charts

References

External links
 Only for Love single
 Limahl Official British Website
 KajaFax - The Officially Approved Limahl & Kajagoogoo Community & Fan Club
 Unofficial Limahl & Kajagoogoo YouTube video archives

Limahl songs
1984 debut singles
1984 songs